Trachyderes cingualtus is a species of beetles in the family Cerambycidae. It is present in Brazil, Peru and Bolivia.

References
 Biolib
 cingulatus Worldwide Cerambycoidea Photo Gallery
 Maria Helena M. Galileo, Ubirajara R. Martins   Novas espécies e nota sobre Cerambycidae (Coleoptera) neotropicais da coleção Arriagada, Santiago, Chile
 James E. Wappes  Preliminary Checklist of Bolivian Cerambycidae (Coleoptera) – II (June, 2007 Revision)

Trachyderini
Beetles described in 1825